Otis D. Armstrong (November 15, 1950 – October 13, 2021) was an American professional football player who was a running back in the National Football League (NFL). He was selected in the first round with the ninth overall pick in the 1973 NFL Draft. He played for the Denver Broncos for his entire career from 1973 to 1980.

High school
Armstrong attended Farragut High School in Chicago, and was inducted into the Chicagoland Sports Hall of Fame.

College career
Before his NFL career, Armstrong played for Purdue University becoming the school's all-time leading rusher and leader in all-purpose yards. Armstrong was selected to Purdue's All-Time team in 1987 as part of a celebration of 100 years of football at Purdue.  He was inducted into the Purdue Intercollegiate Athletics Hall of Fame in 1997.

Armstrong finished his 3 college seasons with 4,601 All-purpose yards (3,315 rushing yards, 897 yards from kickoff returns and 389 passing yards). He also scored 24 touchdowns (17 rushing and 7 on returns).  He was selected the Big Ten MVP in 1972, leading the league in rushing and total offense, while being selected 1st team All-Conference.  He participated in 4 All-Star games; the Hula Bowl, the East-West Shrine Game, the Coaches' All-American Game, and the Chicago College All-Star game.

Over the course of his Purdue career, Armstrong became the all-time leading rusher in Big Ten Conference and Purdue history and ranked sixth in NCAA history at the time. His total of 3,315 yards in three years bettered the previous mark of 3,212 yards by Alan Ameche of Wisconsin - established in four years.  He still holds the Purdue single game rushing record (276 yds vs. arch-rival Indiana.)  Armstrong finished as the all-time leader in All-Purpose yards at Purdue (4,601 yds), he is currently 4th all-time.

On May 16, 2012; Armstrong was selected for induction into the College Football Hall of Fame.  Armstrong will be the 13th Boilermaker (9 players, 4 coaches) inducted into the College Football Hall of Fame.

Professional career
In his second NFL season, Armstrong led the league in rushing yards (1,407) and yards per carry (5.3). In the 1977 season, he assisted the Denver Broncos to an appearance in Super Bowl XII, which they lost to the Dallas Cowboys 27-10.

Armstrong finished his 8 NFL seasons with 4,453 rushing yards, 123 receptions for 1,302 receiving yards, and 879 yards from kickoff returns. He also scored 32 touchdowns (25 rushing and 7 receiving).

Death 
Otis Armstrong died on October 13, 2021, surrounded by his family and loved ones. He was 70.

NFL career statistics

References

1950 births
2021 deaths
Players of American football from Chicago
All-American college football players
American football running backs
Purdue Boilermakers football players
Denver Broncos players
American Conference Pro Bowl players
College Football Hall of Fame inductees
Farragut Career Academy alumni